The Aberdeen Citizen was the highest distributed free newspaper in Aberdeen. It was a weekly newspaper. Launched in 1989, as the Aberdeen Herald & Post, it was re-launched as its current title in 2002. It provided a round-up of the week's community news, sport and events to over 75,000 households in the city and surrounding areas. "We have a good team spirit at the Aberdeen Citizen and we work together to make sure that every resident in Aberdeen City and Shire gets their paper!" The Aberdeen Citizen expanded progressively since its launch in 1989 and won "The Best Free Newspaper In Scotland" Award. 

The paper's print version ceased publication on 23 May 2018. However, its online version has been merged with The Press and Journal (Scotland).

External links
Official website
Aberdeen Citizen official site

1989 establishments in Scotland
2018 disestablishments in Scotland
Defunct newspapers published in the United Kingdom
Defunct weekly newspapers
Mass media in Aberdeen
Newspapers established in 1989
Publications disestablished in 2018